The 2007 edition of the Campeonato Carioca kicked off on January 19 and ended on May 4, 2007. It is the official tournament organized by FFERJ (Federação de Futebol do Estado do Rio de Janeiro, or Rio de Janeiro State Football Federation. Only clubs based in the Rio de Janeiro State are allowed to play. Twelve teams contested this edition. Flamengo won the title for the 29th time.

System
The tournament was divided in two stages:
 Taça Guanabara: The 12 clubs were divided into two groups. teams from each group played in single round-robin format against the others in their group. Top two teams in each group advanced to semifinal and then, to the final, played in two matches. 
 Taça Rio: The teams from one group play against teams from the other group once. Top two teams in each group qualify to semifinal and final, to be played in two matches. 
 Finals: Taça Guanabara and Taça Rio winners play twice  at Maracanã Stadium. If the same club wins both stages, they will be declared champions and the final won't be necessary.

Championship

Taça Guanabara

Group A

Group B

Semifinals

Finals

Taça Rio

Group A

Group B

Semifinals

Finals

Championship finals

Aggregate table

References

Campeonato Carioca seasons
Carioca